Louis Jude Ferrigno Sr. (born November 9, 1951) is an American actor and retired professional bodybuilder. As a bodybuilder, Ferrigno won an IFBB Mr. America title and two consecutive IFBB Mr. Universe titles; and appeared in the documentary film Pumping Iron. As an actor, he is best known for his title role in the CBS television series The Incredible Hulk and vocally reprising the role in subsequent animated and computer-generated incarnations. He has also appeared in European-produced fantasy-adventures such as Sinbad of the Seven Seas and Hercules, and as himself in the sitcom The King of Queens and the 2009 comedy I Love You, Man.

Early life
Ferrigno was born in Brooklyn, New York, to Victoria and Matt Ferrigno, a police lieutenant. He is of Italian descent. Soon after he was born, Ferrigno says he believes he had series of ear infections and lost 75 to 80% of his hearing, though his condition was not diagnosed until he was three years old. Hearing loss and his speech impediment caused Ferrigno to be bullied by peers during his childhood who called him "deaf" and "mute". He began reading comic books such as Hulk and Spider-Man at this time, later saying "I was obsessed with power", and "I wanted to be strong enough so that I could be able to defend myself".

Ferrigno started weight training at age 13, citing bodybuilder and Hercules star Steve Reeves as one of his role models. Because he could not afford to buy weights, he made his own using a broomstick and pails which he partially filled with cement. He was also a fan of the Hercules films that starred Reeves. Ferrigno attended St. Athanasius Grammar School and Brooklyn Technical High School, where he learned metal working.

Bodybuilding career
After graduating from high school in 1969, Ferrigno won his first major title, IFBB Mr. America. Four years later, he won the title IFBB Mr. Universe. Early in his career he lived in Columbus, Ohio and trained with Arnold Schwarzenegger. In 1974, he came in second on his first attempt at the Mr. Olympia competition. He came in third the following year, and his attempt to beat Arnold Schwarzenegger was the subject of the 1977 documentary Pumping Iron. The documentary made Ferrigno famous.

These victories, however, did not provide enough income for him to earn a living. His first paying job was as a $10-an-hour sheet metal worker in a Brooklyn factory, where he worked for three years. He did not enjoy the dangerous work, and left after a friend and co-worker accidentally cut off his own hand.

Following this, Ferrigno left the competition circuit for many years, a period that included a brief stint as a defensive lineman for the Toronto Argonauts in the Canadian Football League. He had never played football, and was cut after two games. Ferrigno left the world of Canadian football after he broke the legs of a fellow player during a scrimmage.

Ferrigno, who stands at almost , weighed in during competition at 268 lb (130 kg) in 1975 and 315 lb (142 kg) in 1992.

Ferrigno competed in the first annual World's Strongest Man competition in 1977, where he finished fourth in a field of eight competitors.

In the early 1990s, Ferrigno returned to bodybuilding, competing for the 1992 and 1993 Mr. Olympia titles. Finishing 12th and 10th, respectively, he then turned to the 1994 Masters Olympia, where his attempt to beat Robbie Robinson and Boyer Coe was the subject of the 1996 documentary Stand Tall. After this, he retired from competition.

Acting career

1977–2008
In 1977, Ferrigno was cast as the Hulk in The Incredible Hulk. Despite the fact that they were rarely on camera together, Ferrigno and who played the Hulk's "normal" alter became friends; Ferrigno has described Bixby as a "mentor" and "father figure" who took him under his wing. Ferrigno also singles out the instances in which Bixby directed Ferrigno in some episodes as particularly memorable. Ferrigno continued playing the Hulk role until 1981, although the last two episodes were not broadcast until May 1982. Later, he and Bixby co-starred in three The Incredible Hulk TV movies.

In November 1978 and again in May 1979 Ferrigno appeared in Battle of the Network Stars. He portrayed the titular character in the 1983 science fantasy adventure film Hercules, and received mixed-to-negative reviews for his performance. He was, however, praised by Marylynn Uricchio, a film critic for the Pittsburgh Post-Gazette, and Andy Brack of Charleston City Paper. Gary Allen Smith, author of the book Epic Films, complimented Ferrigno's physical strength and aesthetics in the film: "At 6'5" and 262 pounds, he is a massive and thoroughly convincing Hercules". In 2014, Decider named Ferrigno the tenth "hottest onscreen Hercules ever".

In 1983, Ferrigno appeared as John Six on the short-lived medical drama Trauma Center.

Ferrigno played himself during intermittent guest appearances on the CBS sitcom The King of Queens, beginning in 2000 and continuing until the program's conclusion in 2007. He and his wife Carla were depicted as the main characters' next-door neighbors. Because of his role as the title character on The Incredible Hulk, he is often the target of Hulk jokes by Doug and his friends.

He made cameo appearances as a security guard in both the 2003 film Hulk and the 2008 film The Incredible Hulk, in which he also voiced the Hulk. In the latter film, Bruce Banner (Edward Norton) bribes him with a pizza in order to gain entry into a university building. He then went on to voice the Hulk in other Marvel Cinematic Universe films, uncredited. He continued to be known as the voice of the Hulk until 2015's Avengers: Age of Ultron. Ferrigno has since been replaced by Mark Ruffalo as the voice of Hulk in subsequent films.

2009–present

He trained Michael Jackson on and off beginning in the early 1990s, and in 2009, he helped Jackson get into shape for a planned series of concerts in London, which were ultimately cancelled due to Jackson's untimely death.

Ferrigno took part in a Smosh video, titled "I Love Lou Ferrigno", in which he is tracked down by one of Smosh's members, Anthony, in Hollywood. The skit ends with Ferrigno knocking Anthony unconscious, in response to Ian's claim that Anthony stole Ferrigno's Butterfinger.

Ferrigno has his own line of fitness equipment called Ferrigno Fitness. In January 2009, he provided equipment to The Price Is Right for use as a One Bid prize, and demonstrated the equipment himself.

In 2016, Ferrigno appeared as a playable Lego version of himself in Lego Marvel's Avengers.

Non-acting endeavors
In February 2006, Ferrigno was sworn in as a Los Angeles County, California, reserve sheriff's deputy, Level II. In November 2010, Maricopa County, Arizona sheriff Joe Arpaio swore Ferrigno in as a member of a volunteer sheriff posse, which also included actors Steven Seagal and Peter Lupus, in order to help control illegal immigration in the Phoenix Valley area.

Ferrigno was a contestant on season five of the NBC reality television series The Celebrity Apprentice, which premiered in February 2012. He appeared on the program in order to raise money for his charity, the Muscular Dystrophy Association. Ferrigno was Team Unanimous' project manager for the task depicted in the fifth episode, "I'm Going to Mop the Floor With You," which was to create a viral video to promote O-Cedar's ProMist Spray Mop, placing him in competition with actress Tia Carrere, the project manager of the women's team, Forte. In addition to the usual $20,000 awarded to the charity of the project manager of the winning team, O-Cedar pledged an additional $30,000 for that task. Team Unanimous' video—in which Ferrigno appeared dancing while mopping—won the task, winning the $50,000 for Muscular Dystrophy Association. He was fired in episode nine, "Ad Hawk", which involved creating a 60-second commercial for Entertainment.com.

In June 2012, Ferrigno was sworn in as a reserve deputy to the San Luis Obispo County, California, Sheriff's Department. There he completed his level I law enforcement academy, bringing his training up to full peace officer status. In September 2013, Ferrigno was sworn in as a special deputy to the Delaware County, Ohio, Sheriff's Department.

In May 2018, President Donald Trump appointed Ferrigno to be a member of his Council on Sports, Fitness & Nutrition.

Personal life
Due to ear infections he had soon after birth, Ferrigno lost 75 to 80% of his hearing and has been using hearing aids since the age of five. Ferrigno says his hearing loss helped shape his sense of determination in his youth, saying, "I think that if I wasn't hard of hearing I wouldn't be where I am now. Early on, as a youngster it was difficult, but I'm not ashamed to talk about it because many people have misconceptions about hearing loss; like who has hearing loss and what it's like not to hear, so I do talk about it. I think my hearing loss helped create a determination within me to be all that I can be, and gave me a certain strength of character too. Anytime I do a movie or a TV show, I make them aware of my hearing loss at the beginning, and that makes it much easier for all of us to communicate and get the job done." Later in life, he received a cochlear implant which restored much of his hearing.

Ferrigno married Susan Groff in 1978, divorcing a year later. On May 3, 1980, he married psychotherapist Carla Green, who then also began serving as his manager; she later became a personal trainer. They have three children: Shanna (born 1981), Louis Jr. (born 1984), and Brent (born 1990). Shanna has a recurring role as Nurse Janice in Days of Our Lives, and appeared in the NBC series Windfall, as well as the television film Within, and in 2005 she appeared in the E! reality television series Filthy Rich: Cattle Drive. Louis Jr. was a linebacker for the University of Southern California Trojans football team. He currently plays a recurring role in the TV series S.W.A.T., airing on CBS.

Ferrigno has filed suit against his younger brother, Andrew, on two occasions over the use of the name Ferrigno in business ventures.

Competitions
1971: Pro Mr. America – WBBG, Teen 1st
1971: Teen Mr. America – AAU, 4th, Most Muscular 5th
1972: Pro Mr. America – WBBG, 2nd
1972: NABBA Mr. Universe, Tall 2nd
1973: IFBB Mr. America, Overall Winner
1973: IFBB Mr. Universe, Tall 1st, Overall Winner
1974: IFBB Mr. International
1974: IFBB Mr. Universe, Tall 1st, Overall Winner
1974 Mr. Olympia, Heavyweight 2nd
1975 Mr. Olympia, Heavyweight 3rd place
1992 Mr. Olympia, 12th
1993 Mr. Olympia, 10th
1994: Olympia Masters, 2nd

Magazine covers

Muscle & Fitness (March 1982, September 1982, March 1983, January 1986, June 1987, July 1988, April 1989, March 1993, March 1994, April 1996)
Flex (November 1983, August 1985, August 1989, August 1992, October 1992, June 1993, March 1994, November 1994, November 2017)
Muscle Builder (May 1974, July 1974, April 1977, September 1977, July 1979, March 1980, May 1980)
Iron Man (July 1973, August 1988, October 1992, November 1994, April 2009)
Bodybuilding Lifestyle (December 1991, May 1992)
Muscle Mag International (March 1979, December 1983, November 1994)
Muscular Development (February 1981, October 1992, April 2009)
Muscle Training Illustrated (May 1972)
Natural Bodybuilding (February 1983)
Strength & Health (November 1983)

Filmography

Film

Television

See also
List of male professional bodybuilders

References

External links

 
 
 
 

1951 births
American bodybuilders
American disabled sportspeople
American male deaf actors
American male film actors
American male television actors
American male voice actors
American people of Italian descent
American strength athletes
Brooklyn Technical High School alumni
California Republicans
Deaf sportspeople
Living people
Male actors from New York City
New York (state) Republicans
Participants in American reality television series
People from Brooklyn
Professional bodybuilders
Sheet metal workers
The Apprentice (franchise) contestants